Agil Magomed oğlu Abbas is a deputy of National Assembly of Azerbaijan and a member of Azerbaijan Writers Union since 1986.

Biography
Abbas was born in Kolalı, Agjabadi on 1 April 1953. In 1955, when he was two years old, he has moved to Aghdam together with his family and lived there. He continued his education on the faculty of philology in Azerbaijan University of Languages after finishing secondary school N1 in Aghdam.(1970–1976.) He began his working activity as a teacher at boarding-school in Agsu, worked as newspaper photographer and departmental manager at the "Science and Life" journal. Currently, he is an editor-in chief at the Justice and Grey Wolf newspaper. 
He was elected the deputy of National Assembly of Azerbaijan Republic in 2005.

Creativity
He began his literary creativity in the 1970s, his first published work was "Sweetness" (Shirinlik) which was printed by Literature and Art (Ədəbiyyat və incəsənət) newspaper. Systematically, "Star" (Ulduz) and "Mockery Nazim" (Şəbədə Nazim) appeared in the journal Azerbaijan in 1977. Since that time, he has appeared in the media regularly. He is an author of narratives such as "Day of judgement" (Qiyamət gecəsi) and "Black Long Hair" (Qapqara uzun saçlar). He had created many samples of prose on war, the village themes.

Works
 The Happiest Man
 Batmanqılınj
 Black Long Hair
 Judgement Night
 A Way that Does Not Lead to Shusha

Awards 
 Komsomol Prize (1987)
 Golden Pen of the Azerbaijan Journalists Union
 Mammad Araz Award

References

External links
 Az. Aqil Abbas- Dolu
 Azadliq.org – Aqil Abbas
 kulis.az

Azerbaijani writers
Azerbaijani philologists
Living people
1953 births
People from Aghjabadi District